Atchison Township is a township in Nodaway County, in the U.S. state of Missouri.

Atchison Township was established in 1845, and named after David Rice Atchison, a United States Senator from Missouri.

References

Townships in Missouri
Townships in Nodaway County, Missouri